Mary Catherine Jordan (born November 10, 1960) is a Pulitzer Prize-winning American journalist, best-selling author and National Correspondent for the Washington Post. 

For 14 years she was a foreign correspondent and she has written from nearly 40 countries. With her husband, Washington Post journalist Kevin Sullivan, Jordan ran the newspaper's bureaus in Tokyo, Mexico City and London. Jordan also was the founding editor and head of content for Washington Post Live, which organizes political debates, conferences and news events for the media company.

Jordan frequently appears on TV. She wrote the bestselling 2020 book, “The Art of Her Deal,” the unauthorized biography of Melania Trump. With Sullivan, she also wrote Hope: A Memoir of Survival in Cleveland, which was a No. 1 New York Times bestseller in  2015. Hope is written with Amanda Berry and Gina DeJesus, two of the women who were kidnapped and held for a decade in Cleveland, Jordan's hometown.

Jordan also interviews some of the world's most accomplished people for the popular “What it Takes” podcast created by the American Academy of Achievement. Among those she has spoken with as part of this podcast series, include music legends Julie Andrews, Itzhak Perlman, Peter Gabriel, Buddy Guy, Jimmy Page and Judy Collins. She has also interviewed former president Jimmy Carter, former Secretary of State General Colin Powell, actor Michael Caine, baseball Hall of Famer Cal Ripken Jr., Nobel Prize-winning scientist Jennifer Doudna, and acclaimed novelist Ian McEwan.

Early life and career

Jordan, a daughter of Irish immigrants, was born and raised in Cleveland, Ohio. For her high school experience, she attended Saint Joseph Academy in Cleveland, Ohio (Class of 1979).  She graduated from Georgetown University in 1983 and earned a master's degree from the Columbia University Graduate School of Journalism in 1984. In 1989–90, Jordan was awarded a Nieman Fellowship by Harvard University.

For a year at Trinity College in Dublin, Ireland, she studied W. B. Yeats and other Irish poets. She was given her first job in the newspaper business by Irish author and editor Tim Pat Coogan, who hired her to write a column in The Irish Press. She enrolled in Japanese language classes at Georgetown University before moving to Tokyo for four years and studied Spanish on a post-graduate fellowship at Stanford University before moving to Mexico for five years.

In 2018, Jordan was a national correspondent for the Washington Post writing about politics and the Trump administration and appearing on ABC, BBC, and other TV networks. She covered the 2016 campaign, writing in-depth political stories and profiles.  Jordan was also the founding editor and moderator for Washington Post Live, which hosted forums including "The 40th Anniversary of Watergate" in June 2012 that featured key Watergate figures including former White House counsel John Dean, Washington Post editor Ben Bradlee, and reporters Bob Woodward and Carl Bernstein. It was held at the Watergate hotel.

She has interviewed many newsmakers all over the world including singer and songwriter Paul McCartney, Colombian novelist Gabriel Garcia Marquez, British Prime Minister Tony Blair, and Benjamin Arellano Felix, one of Mexico's most notorious drug kingpins.  She has written extensively about injustices and discrimination against women including the exceedingly low conviction rate of rape in Britain and the many girls in India denied schooling solely because they were not born male.

Career recognition and awards

Jordan and Sullivan won the 2003 Pulitzer Prize for International Reporting for their Post series on the "horrific conditions in Mexico's criminal justice system and how they affect the daily lives of people," as the Pulitzer Board described. Along with four Post photographers, Jordan and Sullivan were also finalists for the 2009 Pulitzer Prize for International Reporting for their series of stories on the difficulties women face around the world. The Pulitzer jury called the series a "sensitive examination of how females in the developing world are often oppressed from birth to death, a reporting project marked by indelible portraits of women and girls and enhanced by multimedia presentations."

Jordan and Sullivan are the authors of “Trump on Trial: The Investigation, Impeachment, Acquittal and Aftermath,” published by Scribner in August 2020. The book, with reporting contributions from Washington Post colleagues, received a “starred” review by Kirkus, which said it “sets a standard for political storytelling with impeccable research and lively writing.” It was reviewed on the cover of the New York Times Book Review.

Jordan and Sullivan authored The Prison Angel: Mother Antonia's Journey from Beverly Hills to a Life of Service in a Mexican Jail (The Penguin Press, 2005). In 2006, the book won the Christopher Award, which "salutes media that affirm the highest values of the human spirit."

Together with Amanda Berry and Gina DeJesus, two of the women kidnapped and held for nearly a decade by Ariel Castro in Cleveland, Jordan and Sullivan wrote the bestselling book Hope: A Memoir of Survival in Cleveland, published by Viking in April 2015.

Jordan has also won numerous other awards including the George Polk Award, and accolades from the Overseas Press Club of America and the Society of Professional Journalists.

In 2016, Jordan was the winner of the Washington Post’s Eugene Meyer Award for her exceptional contributions to the paper.

Jordan was part of the team that reported Trump Revealed: An American Journey of Ambition, Ego, Money, and Power, a Washington Post biography of Donald Trump published by Scribner in 2016.

Jordan was a contributing writer to Nine Irish Lives: The Thinkers, Fighters and Artists Who Helped Build America, edited by Mark Bailey and published by Algonquin Books in 2018.

Works

Bibliography

Kevin Sullivan; Mary Jordan (25 August 2020). "Trump on Trial: The Investigation, Impeachment, Acquittal and Aftermath." Scribner. ISBN 978-0821-5299-4.

Appearances and interviews

Shoulder to Shoulder: The Art and Chaos of Collaboration (Poynter Institute, 2005)
The Cleveland kidnapping: 'He took everything away' (Washington Post TV, 2015)
Hope: Survival in Cleveland: 2015 National Book Festival (Library of Congress, 2015)

Selected works from 2003 Pulitzer Prize-winning stories
Disparate Justice Imprisons Mexico's Poor
In Mexico, an Unpunished Crime
Mexico's Children Suffer in "Little Jails"
Convicts are Condemned to a Paradise in Mexico

Selected works from Pulitzer Prize-finalist series on the difficulties facing women
'This is the Destiny of Girls'
In Affluent Germany, Women Still Confront Traditional Bias
In Britain, Rape Cases Seldom Result in a Conviction

Other selected works
Plugging the Planet Into the World
Middle Class Plunging Back Into Poverty
Death of 3 Salesmen – Partners in Suicide
A Hymn to Yesterday: Paul McCartney Premieres His Choral Work, an Elegy for Linda
The un-Celebrity President
Fear, Hope and Deportations
The Painful Truth about Teeth 
How an undocumented Irish immigrant became an unofficial U.S. Diplomat 
Emmanuel Macron is 39 and his wife is 64. French women say it’s about time
Meet Melania Trump, a new model for First Lady

Poynter Institute interview with Sullivan and Jordan
Shoulder to Shoulder: The Art and Chaos of Collaboration

References

External links

1960 births
Living people
American expatriates in Ireland
American expatriates in Japan
American expatriates in Mexico
American expatriates in the United Kingdom
American people of Irish descent
Pulitzer Prize for International Reporting winners
The Washington Post people
Writers from Cleveland
Georgetown University alumni
Columbia University Graduate School of Journalism alumni
George Polk Award recipients